Vall-Llebrera is a locality located in the municipality of Artesa de Segre, in Province of Lleida province, Catalonia, Spain. As of 2020, it has a population of 16.

Geography 
Vall-Llebrera is located 66km northeast of Lleida.

References

Populated places in the Province of Lleida